John Linthwaite Bend (December 20, 1922 – April 6, 1978) was a Canadian professional ice hockey centre who played eight games with the New York Rangers. He was born in Poplar Point, Manitoba.

Awards and achievements
Turnbull Cup (MJHL) Championship (1942)
Memorial Cup Championship (1942)
MJHL First All-Star Team (1942)
MJHL Scoring Champion (1942)
Paul W. Loudon (USHL) Championship (1949)
"Honoured Member" of the Manitoba Hockey Hall of Fame

External links

1922 births
1978 deaths
Canadian ice hockey centres
Ice hockey people from Manitoba
New Haven Ramblers players
New York Rangers players
Portage Terriers players